Joey J. Marciano (born January 11, 1995) is an American professional baseball pitcher for the San Francisco Giants organization. He also played for the Italian national team in the 2023 World Baseball Classic.

Career
Marciano grew up in Chicago. He attended Roberto Clemente Community Academy and began playing baseball in his freshman year. He also participated in Reviving Baseball in Inner Cities. Marciano received a scholarship to play college baseball at John A. Logan College. As a freshman, Marciano was named the Great Rivers Athletic Conference's freshman of the year. In his sophomore year, he had a 7–4 win-loss record and a 2.52 earned run average in 11 games started, with six complete games and two shutouts, and he was named the conference's pitcher of the year. After two years at Logan, he transferred to Southern Illinois University Carbondale to continue his college baseball career with the Southern Illinois Salukis.

The San Francisco Giants selected Marciano in the 36th round of the 2017 Major League Baseball draft. In 2018, Marciano played for the Augusta GreenJackets, and was named to the South Atlantic League All-Star Game. He struggled with the San Jose Giants in 2019, allowing 40 hits in  innings pitched, and retired from baseball in July. Back in Chicago, he trained with D. J. Snelten, who helped him to add  on his fastball. Marciano chose to return to baseball in 2020, but the minor league season was canceled due to the COVID-19 pandemic. He pitched for the Richmond Flying Squirrels in the 2021 season and the Sacramento River Cats in the 2022 season.

In 2023, Marciano played for the Italian national team in the 2023 World Baseball Classic.

Personal life
Marciano has three younger sisters and a younger brother.

Rocky Marciano is a cousin twice removed on his father's side of the family.

References

External links

Living people
1995 births
American people of Italian descent
Sportspeople from Chicago
John A. Logan Volunteers baseball players
Southern Illinois Salukis baseball players
Arizona League Giants players
Augusta GreenJackets players
San Jose Giants players
Richmond Flying Squirrels players
Sacramento River Cats players
2023 World Baseball Classic players